Dress socks are dress clothes socks for men traditionally in dark colours like black, blue, gray or brown. For more casual wear they are sometimes offered in other colours or checkered patterns. Dress socks are worn in accompaniment to dress shoes of varying styles depending on dress codes or personal preferences.

Dress socks come in a variety of heights. They come ankle-high, mid-calf high (the most common), and over the calf. Dress socks have been known to slip down the leg, causing the wearer to have to constantly pull them up, why in the past men would buy garters or sock suspenders to help this until the introduction in the 1960s of better elastics such as spandex, which made that mostly unnecessary despite for some men with larger calves needing extra assistance of garters to keep socks from slipping.

See also
 Sock
 Toe socks

References

Socks
Clothing